The 2002 Colchester Borough Council election took place on 2 May 2002 to elect members of Colchester Borough Council in Essex, England. This was the same day as the other 2002 local elections in the United Kingdom.

Due to boundary changes, every seat was up for election and the council stayed under no overall control.

Summary
Both the Liberal Democrats and Conservatives gained seats to move to 26 and 24 seats respectively. This was at the expense of the Labour party who lost 9 seats to only have 6 councillors.

In total there were 24 new councillors elected, with a number of sitting councillors being defeated, including the leader of the Liberal Democrats on the council, Bill Frame. Frame had previously represented St Mary's ward, but contested Shrub End at the election and failed to be elected. Colin Sykes returned as the leader of the Liberal Democrat group after winning election, 2 years after having lost his seat on the council.

Candidates by party

Election result

Ward results

Shown below are ward results according to the council's election results archive.

Berechurch

Birch and Winstree

Castle

Christ Church

Copford & West Stanway

Dedham & Langham

East Donyland

Fordham & Stour

Great Tey

No Labour candidate as previous (8.5%).

Harbour

Highwoods

Lexden

Marks Tey

Mile End

New Town

Prettygate

Pyefleet

No Labour candidate as previous (16.3%).

St. Andrew's

St. Anne's

St. John's

Shrub End

Stanway

Tiptree

West Bergholt & Eight Ash Green

West Mersea

Wivenhoe Cross

Wivenhoe Quay

References

2002 English local elections
2002
2000s in Essex